Syria Mosque was a 3,700-seat  performance venue located in the Oakland neighborhood of Pittsburgh, Pennsylvania. Constructed in 1911 and dedicated on October 26, 1916, the building was originally built as a "mystical" shrine for the Ancient Arabic Order of the Nobles of the Mystic Shrine (the Shriners) and designed by Huehl, Schmidt & Holmes architectural firm of Chicago.  It was recognized as one of the best examples of "exotic revival architecture".

Located at 4400 Bigelow Boulevard, it held numerous events over the years, mainly highlighted by concerts of the Pittsburgh Symphony Orchestra and numerous internationally recognized music performers, as well as political rallies and speeches. Despite community efforts to have Syria Mosque designated a historic landmark, the building was demolished August 27, 1991.

The Medinah Temple in Chicago (constructed one year after this building by the same firm) is a similar building still in existence (though now converted to retail space).

Concert events 
Among the concert events:
 February 28, 1920: Enrico Caruso performs just 18 months before his death.
 October 5, 1924: John Philip Sousa
 Benny Goodman (1938, 1941)
Sergei Rachmaninoff with the Pittsburgh Symphony Orchestra (1931, 1934, 1936, 1937, 1941)
 January 28, 1944: Symphony No. 1 by Leonard Bernstein had its premiere at the center.
 February 1 and 3, 1946: Carol Brice with the Pittsburgh Symphony Orchestra, conducted by Fritz Reiner
 Louis Armstrong (three appearances, beginning in 1949)
 October 11, 1950: Billy Eckstine, George Shearing and Miles Davis
 Charlie Parker (1950)
 February 27, 1951: Nat King Cole Trio and Tommy Dorsey and His Orchestra, featuring vocalists Frances Irvin and Johnny Amoroso
 January 9, 1953: World Premiere of the Heitor Villa-Lobos composition Piano Concerto no. 4, with Bernardo Segall and the Pittsburgh Symphony Orchestra conducted by Villa-Lobos.
 Duke Ellington (in 1954)
 April 28, 1955: Horace Heidt performs at Syria Mosque and MC's a talent competition, all for charity.
 Art Blakey (several occasions, in 1955 with the Jazz Messengers)
 Miles Davis (1955)
 Bill Haley and the Comets with Bo Diddley and the Drifters (1955)
 Buddy Holly (four times in 1957-1958)
 Sam Cooke
 Ahmad Jamal in 1959
 Benny Goodman in 1959
 Dionne Warwick and Solomon Burke in 1963. 
 Bob Dylan in 1966 and again in 1990
 The Who in 1969 
 The Band in 1970 and on September 21, 1976, the concert "Next to Last Waltz". On Thanksgiving night, November 25, 1976, at Winterland Ballroom in San Francisco, they played their final concert. It became the Martin Scorsese documentary film The Last Waltz.
 The two-year-old Pittsburgh Ballet Theater opened its first season as a professional organization in 1970.
 Mickey Newbury in 1971
 The Allman Brothers Band in 1971 (turned into an album in 2022)
 Matthews Southern Comfort, Deep Purple and Faces July 16, 1971
 Yes on December 16, 1971 on their Fragile Tour
 Carly Simon in 1972
 Pink Floyd in 1971 and 1972
 The Kinks September 1, 1972 and April 13, 1974
 Captain Beefheart and the Magic Band on October 15, 1972
 Bette Midler in 1973, accompanied by, a then unknown, Barry Manilow.
 Jim Croce on February 23, 1973.  Croce was scheduled to return to the Syria Mosque on October 27 that year, but he died in a plane crash on September 20.
 The New York Dolls on October 18, 1973
 Barbara Mandrell October 26, 1973
 The Doobie Brothers on November 15, 1973
 The Beach Boys on August 31, 1973
 David Bowie in 1974
 The Carpenters in 1974
 ZZ Top in 1974
 The Eagles in 1974
 Jesse Colin Young in 1974
 Genesis on May 3, 1974 (Selling England by the Pound Tour), 1975 
Helen Reddy and Robert Klein on April 2, 1976
Genesis (band) on 30 November 1974 (The Lamb Lies Down on Broadway Tour) and April 13, 1976 (A Trick of the Tail Tour); a recording of the April 13, 1976 show has since been widely bootlegged.
 Frank Zappa on November 6, 1974, on November 17, 1984 and on February 25, 1988 / March 8, 1988
 Van Morrison on May 21, 1974
 Miles Davis on March 17, 1975
 Bruce Springsteen on August 9, 1975.
 Stephen Stills on October 25, 1975
 George Benson (1976, 1977 and 1986)
 James Brown (1976 and 1986)
 James Taylor on July 25, 1976
 Kansas on October 30, 1976, in a show that was recorded and later broadcast by 102.5 WDVE-FM
 Bob Marley (1977)
 Beatlemania (musical) in 1981, shortly after the death of John Lennon
 June 14, 1982: The inaugural Mellon Jazz Festival (among other venues)
 Gallagher (Comedian), October 1982.
 Men at Work (opening act INXS), August 1983.
 August 4, 1983: Count Basie's final public concert performance.
 Dio in 1983
 Dire Straits in 1985.
 Tears for Fears on June 15, 1985
 Yngwie Malmsteen's Rising Force on July 9, 1985
 Black Sabbath in 1986
 Stevie Ray Vaughan and Double Trouble in 1986
 The Fabulous Thunderbirds in 1986 billed as "The Thunderbirds"
 R.E.M. in 1985 and 1986
 The Bangles in a MTV broadcast concert 1986 
 New Order in 1986
 [Peabody High School Graduation June 6, 1986]
 Hüsker Dü on March 10, 1987
 The Cure, Whitesnake and Quiet Riot in 1987
 Jimmy Page in 1988
 Morton Downey, Jr in 1988
 The Ramones in 1987
 Jane's Addiction in 1988
 Anthrax, Exodus and Helloween in 1989 (as part of the MTV's Headbangers Ball Tour)
 Winger in 1989
 Jimmy Buffett on December 7, 1989
 Manhattan Transfer on December 27, 1989
 Public Enemy, Queen Latifah and Biz Markie on February 1, 1990
 XYZ (American band) on March 10, 1990
Benefit for Porky Chedwick on February 22, 1991
 Deep Purple on April 22, 1991

Political events 
Among the political events:
 October 24, 1923: British Prime Minister David Lloyd George.
 January 2, 1944: Harry S Truman
 November 2, 1944: Harry S Truman, Orson Welles, Gov. Gifford Pinchot and Mrs. Kermit Roosevelt
 November 10, 1947: Making international headlines Henry A. Wallace announces he is a candidate for president.
 June 6, 1950: Ronald Reagan
 October 8, 1952: Richard Nixon addressing a crowd of 3,900.
 October 22, 1952: Harry S Truman
 November 1, 1956: Richard Nixon & Pat Nixon 
 October 27, 1958: Dwight D. Eisenhower
 October 10, 1960: John F. Kennedy
 October 24, 1960: Richard Nixon
 November 4, 1966: The last public appearance by longtime mayor, governor and boss David L. Lawrence.

Birthplace of network television 
On January 11, 1949, from 8:30 pm to 11 pm EST, KDKA-TV (then WDTV and part of the DuMont Television Network) began its initial broadcast on its "network" centered in Pittsburgh. The program began with a one-hour local show broadcast from Syria Mosque, then finished with 90 minutes from ABC, CBS, NBC, and DuMont, featuring stars such as Arthur Godfrey, Milton Berle, DuMont host Ted Steele, and many other celebrities.  The station also represented a milestone in the television industry, providing the first "network" of a coaxial cable feed that included Pittsburgh and 13 other cities from Boston to St. Louis.

Demolition 
Despite community efforts to have the building designated a historic landmark, the Syria Mosque was torn down on August 27, 1991. The site serves as a parking lot for the University of Pittsburgh Medical Center. Plans were announced that University of Pittsburgh would acquire it from the medical center in 2016.

References

External links 

 Picture Album
 Pittsburgh Music History -Lost Temple of Music
 Resurrecting the Syria Mosque
 Pittsburgh Post Gazette retrospective

Music venues in Pittsburgh
Music venues completed in 1912
1912 establishments in Pennsylvania
Demolished music venues in the United States
Demolished buildings and structures in Pittsburgh
Shriners